Boulder County is a county located in the U.S. state of Colorado of the United States. As of the 2020 census, the population was 330,758. The most populous municipality in the county and the county seat is Boulder.

Boulder County comprises the Boulder, Colorado Metropolitan Statistical Area, which is included in the Denver–Aurora, Colorado Combined Statistical Area.

History
Boulder County was one of the original 17 counties created by the Territory of Colorado on November 1, 1861. The county was named for Boulder City and Boulder Creek, so named because of the abundance of boulders in the creek which hampered early gold prospecting efforts.

Before the arrival of the first US settlers, the area was occupied by Native Americans led by Chief Niwot on the plains and seasonally by Utes in the mountains to the west. The first European American settlers were gold prospectors led by Captain Thomas Aikins. His group of about twenty settled at the mouth of Boulder Creek Canyon on October 17, 1858. Chief Niwot told them not to stay and it is said they promised to move into the mountains to prospect in the spring. However in February 1859, they founded the town of Boulder. At about the same time, they also founded the first Gold Mining town in what would become Colorado, Gold Hill which is about 10 miles west from Boulder. Gold Hill was founded because of the placer gold discovered there. The area was the site of the first commercial scale placer mine in Colorado, producing over 5,500 ounces of gold in the first year of operations (1859).

Recent events

In late December 2021, the Marshall Fire raged through the parched lands near Boulder, Colorado. Marshall Fire is the most destructive in Colorado's history.  The fire impacted City of Superior, City of Louisville and unincorporated Boulder County areas.  991 homes were destroyed with an additional 127 damaged.  Over 13,000 people in Superior and 21,000 in Louisville were ultimately evacuated while the fire was spreading due to unusual 100 mile per hour winds. Additionally, one person died and another is missing and presumed dead.  The cause of the fire has not been officially announced, pending an investigation.  However, an incident report filed by a ranger with Boulder Open Space and Mountain Parks identified two ignition points for the fire. The first ignition point was a shed that began to burn at approximately 11:30AM MST, December 30, 2021.  The second ignition point was upwind from the first, and started around noon of the same day on "western side of the Marshall Mesa trailhead".

Geography

Adjacent counties

Major Highways
  U.S. Highway 36 (Denver-Boulder Turnpike)
  U.S. Highway 287
  State Highway 7
  State Highway 42
  State Highway 52
  State Highway 66
  State Highway 72
  State Highway 93
  State Highway 119
  State Highway 170
 Northwest Parkway (tollway)

National protected areas

Rocky Mountain National Park is in Boulder County, Larimer County, and Grand County.  Longs Peak, the park's highest summit at  elevation, is located in Boulder County.

State protected area
Eldorado Canyon State Park

Scenic trails and byways
Continental Divide National Scenic Trail
Peak to Peak Scenic and Historic Byway

Historic district
Colorado Chautauqua National Historic District

Demographics

As of the census of 2000, there were 271,651 people, 114,680 households, and 68,808 families residing in the county. The population density was 392 people per square mile (151/km2). There were 119,900 housing units at an average density of 162 per square mile (62/km2). The racial makeup of the county was 88.54% White, 0.88% Black or African American, 0.61% Native American, 3.06% Asian, 0.06% Pacific Islander, 4.67% from other races, and 2.18% from two or more races. 10.46% of the population were Hispanic or Latino of any race.

There were 114,680 households, out of which 30.70% had children under the age of 18 living with them, 48.90% were married couples living together, 7.70% had a female householder with no husband present, and 40.00% were non-families. 26.30% of all households were made up of individuals, and 5.50% had someone living alone who was 65 years of age or older. The average household size was 2.47 and the average family size was 3.03.

In the county, the population was spread out, with 22.90% under the age of 18, 13.40% from 18 to 24, 33.60% from 25 to 44, 22.30% from 45 to 64, and 7.80% who were 65 years of age or older. The median age was 33 years. For every 100 females, there were 102.20 males. For every 100 females age 18 and over, there were 101.70 males.

In 2014, the median income for a household in the county was $69,407, and the median income for a family was $94,938. Males had a median income of $65,489 versus $48,140 for females. About 7.0% of families and 14.6% of the population were below the poverty line, including 14.6% of those under age 18 and 5.9% of those age 65 or over.

In 2017, Bloomberg ranked the Boulder metropolitan area as the top "brain" area in the US.

Government
Boulder County is divided into three districts each represented by a commissioner elected county-wide. The three commissioners comprise the county Board of Commissioners and represent the county as a whole. Each commissioner must reside in their respective district and may be elected to a maximum of two four-year terms.

The Board of County Commissioners are full-time public servants and approve the budget for the entire County government. The Board also oversees the management of 10 County departments and the daily operations of the county, work that is done by a county manager or a chief administrative officer in some counties.

Boulder County has seven other county-wide elected officials, including the District Attorney, who represents the 20th Judicial District.

Elected officials

Politics
Boulder County went Republican in all but three presidential elections from 1920 to 1984, the exceptions being the national Democratic landslides of 1932, 1936 and 1964. However, it has swung heavily to the Democrats since the late 1980s, and has supported Democrats at every election since 1988. Since the 1990s, it has become one of the most liberal counties in Colorado; in most years, it is the second-strongest Democratic bastion in the state, behind only the City and County of Denver. The GOP has not crossed the 40% mark in the county since 1988. This tracks closely with the Democratic trend in other counties dominated by college towns.

In recent years, the GOP has turned in some of its worst showings in the county in memory. Republicans took less than 28% of the vote in Boulder County in both 2008 and 2012, only 22% in 2016, and just over 20% in 2020.

In 2000, Green Party presidential candidate Ralph Nader took 11.82% of the vote in Boulder County, more than twice the 5.25% he took statewide in Colorado, and more than four times his 2.73% nationwide vote share.

Boulder County has also demonstrated its progressive leanings in referendums on social issues, such as in 2006, when nearly 2/3 of Boulder County voters voted to reject Amendment 43, a constitutional amendment defining marriage as between one man and one woman. Although the amendment passed statewide with 55% of the vote, only 33% of Boulder County supported it. In 2012, over 66% of Boulder County voted in favor of Amendment 64, legalizing marijuana in the state of Colorado.

Local courts
The 20th Judicial District of Colorado, the state trial court of general jurisdiction, serves and is coextensive with Boulder County. As of 2009 the 20th Judicial Circuit has eight District Court judges. The Boulder County Court, the state trial court of limited jurisdiction, consists of five judges and six magistrates.

Boulder County has two combined courthouses:
The Boulder County Justice Center is located in the City of Boulder and is headquarters to the 20th Judicial District of Colorado. The office of the district attorney is also here, as is the Juvenile Assessment Center, the county's combined assessment and detention facility.
The Longmont Courthouse in the City of Longmont acts as an extension of the County Court and the District Attorney's Office.

Communities

Cities
Boulder
Lafayette
Longmont (partly in Weld County)
Louisville

Towns
Erie (partly in Weld County)
Jamestown
Lyons
Nederland
Superior (partly in Jefferson County)
Town of Ward

Census-designated places

Allenspark
Altona
Bark Ranch
Bonanza Mountain Estates
Coal Creek (partly in Gilpin County and Jefferson County)
Crisman
Eldora
Eldorado Springs
Glendale
Gold Hill
Gunbarrel
Hidden Lake
Lazy Acres
Leyner
Mountain Meadows
Niwot
Paragon Estates
Pine Brook Hill
Seven Hills
St. Ann Highlands
Sugarloaf
Sunshine
Tall Timber
Valmont

Other unincorporated communities
Caribou
Canfield
Gooding
Hygiene
Highland
Liggett
Morey
Pinecliffe
Pleasant View Ridge (partly in Weld County)
Tabor

Education
School districts serving Boulder County include:
 Boulder Valley School District RE-2
 Estes Park School District R-3
 St. Vrain Valley School District RE 1J
 Thompson School District R-2J

See also

Jackson County, Jefferson Territory
Colorado census statistical areas
National Register of Historic Places listings in Boulder County, Colorado
Front Range Urban Corridor
Marfell Lakes
North Central Colorado Urban Area
2013 Colorado floods

References

External links
Boulder County Government website
Boulder County USGenWeb
Colorado County Evolution by Don Stanwyck
Colorado Historical Society
Rocky Mountain National Park website

 
Colorado counties
1861 establishments in Colorado Territory
Metropolitan areas of Colorado
Populated places established in 1861